Pat Collins is an American film critic and three-time Emmy winner for WWOR-TV. Collins was an entertainment editor and film critic for Good Morning America and the CBS Morning News and from 1972–1977, hosted the Pat Collins Show on WCBS-TV, for which she won two local Emmy Awards.

Personal life
Collins is married to William Sarnoff. She had previously been married to Joe Raposo from January 1976 until his death in 1989. They had two children together, as well as two children from his previous marriage.  In 1983, she authored a book, How to Be a Really Nice Person. She announced her retirement from WWOR in November 2012.

References

Living people
21st-century American women
American film critics
American non-fiction writers
American women non-fiction writers
American women television journalists
American women film critics
Emmy Award winners
Place of birth missing (living people)
Year of birth missing (living people)